Princess Rosemary of Salm-Salm (13 April 1904 – 3 May 2001) was a member of the princely House of Salm-Salm. Through her marriage to Archduke Hubert Salvator of Austria, Rosemary was a member of the Tuscan line of the House of Habsburg-Lorraine.

Family
Rosemary was born in Potsdam, then in the Kingdom of Prussia, the second child of Emanuel, Hereditary Prince of Salm-Salm and his wife Archduchess Maria Christina of Austria. Through her mother, Rosemary was a granddaughter of Archduke Friedrich, Duke of Teschen and his wife Princess Isabella de Croÿ.

Marriage and issue
Rosemary married Archduke Hubert Salvator of Austria, the second son of Archduke Franz Salvator of Austria, a member of the dynasty which reigned as Grand Dukes of Tuscany until 1860, and his wife Archduchess Marie Valerie of Austria, on 25 November 1926 in a civil ceremony at Anholt and in a religious ceremony on 26 November 1926. Rosemary and Hubert Salvator had thirteen children:

 Archduke Friedrich Salvator (27 November 1927 – 26 March 1999), who married Countess Margit Kalnoky von Korospatak 
 Archduchess Agnes (14 December 1928 – 31 August 2007), who married Prince Karl Alfred of Liechtenstein
 Archduchess Maria Margaretha (born 29 January 1930)
 Archduchess Maria Ludovica (31 January 1931 – 17 April 1999), who married Martin Roland
 Archduchess Maria Adelheid of Austria (28 July 1933 – 10 October 2021)
 Archduchess Elisabeth (18 March 1935-9 October 1998), who married Prince Heinrich von Auersperg-Breunner
 Archduke Andreas Salvator (born 28 April 1936), who firstly married Maria de La Piedad de Los Monteros y Rosillo, and secondly Countess Valerie von Podstatzky Lichtenstein
 Archduchess Josepha (born 2 Sep 1937), who married Clemens, Count von Waldstein
 Archduchess Valerie (born 23 May 1941), who married Maximilian, Margrave of Baden
 Archduchess Maria Alberta of Austria (born 1 June 1944), who married Alexander, Baron von Kottwitz-Erdődy
 Archduke Markus Emanuel Salvator of Austria (born 2 April 1946), who married Hildegard Jungmayr
 Archduke Johann Salvator of Austria (born 18 September 1947), who married Anne Marie Stummer
 Archduke Michael Salvator of Austria (born 2 May 1949), who married Baroness Eva Antonia von Hofman

Princess Rosemary died at Persenbeug Castle, Persenbeug-Gottsdorf, Austria.

Traditional titles
13 April 1904 – 25 November 1926: Her Serene Highness Princess Rosemary zu Salm-Salm, Wildgravine and Rhinegravine of Salm-Salm
25 November 1926 – 23 May 2001: Her Imperial & Royal Highness Archduchess Rosemary of Austria, Princess of Tuscany

Ancestry

References

1904 births
2001 deaths
House of Habsburg-Lorraine
Tuscan princesses
People from Potsdam
Salm-Salm
Austrian princesses